Cucumibacter is a genus in the phylum Pseudomonadota (Bacteria).

Etymology
The name Cucumibacter derives from:Latin noun cucumis, cucumber; New Latin masculine gender noun, a rodbacter, nominally meaning "a rod", but in effect meaning a bacterium, rod; New Latin masculine gender noun Cucumibacter, a cucumber-like rod.

Species
The genus contains a single species, namely C. marinus ( Hwang and Cho 2008,  (Type species of the genus).; Latin masculine gender adjective marinus, referring to the sea, from where the type strain was isolated.)

See also
 Bacterial taxonomy
 Microbiology

References 

Bacteria genera
Hyphomicrobiales
Monotypic bacteria genera